Lucien is a census-designated place (CDP) and unincorporated community in Noble County, Oklahoma, United States. Its population was 88 as of the 2010 census.

Demographics

References

Census-designated places in Noble County, Oklahoma
Census-designated places in Oklahoma
Unincorporated communities in Oklahoma
Unincorporated communities in Noble County, Oklahoma